Montrose is a city in Ashley County, Arkansas, United States. The population was 354 at the 2010 census. Montrose is located where U.S. Route 165 intersects with U.S. Route 82. The town was heavily damaged by an EF2 tornado on January 2, 2023.

Geography
Montrose is located at  (33.298682, -91.497150).

Demographics

2020 census

As of the 2020 United States census, there were 243 people, 152 households, and 113 families residing in the city.

2000 census
As of the census of 2000, there were 526 people, 188 households, and 129 families residing in the city. The racial makeup of the city was 26.24% White, 71.86% Black or African American, 1.71% from other races, and 0.19% from two or more races.  1.90% of the population were Hispanic or Latino of any race.

There were 188 households, out of which 36.2% had children under the age of 18 living with them, 45.7% were married couples living together, 17.6% had a female householder with no husband present, and 30.9% were non-families. 27.7% of all households were made up of individuals, and 13.3% had someone living alone who was 65 years of age or older.  The average household size was 2.80 and the average family size was 3.45.

In the city, the population was spread out, with 32.3% under the age of 18, 9.1% from 18 to 24, 27.4% from 25 to 44, 19.4% from 45 to 64, and 11.8% who were 65 years of age or older.  The median age was 33 years. For every 100 females, there were 91.3 males.  For every 100 females age 18 and over, there were 86.4 males.

The median income for a household in the city was $20,625, and the median income for a family was $22,361. Males had a median income of $24,688 versus $15,536 for females. The per capita income for the city was $10,363.  About 30.4% of families and 34.9% of the population were below the poverty line, including 51.0% of those under age 18 and 28.8% of those age 65 or over.

Education
It is in the Lakeside School District.

References

Cities in Ashley County, Arkansas
Cities in Arkansas